Lastaste is a surname. Notable people with the name include:

Alcide-Vital Lataste (1832–1869), French Roman Catholic priest
Fernand Lataste (1847–1934),  French zoologist
Jacques Lataste (1922–2011), French fencer
Marie Lataste (1822–1847), French Roman Catholic nun and writer

Surnames of French origin